Following centuries of relative ethnic diversity, the population of modern Poland has become nearly completely ethnically homogeneous Polish as a result of the radically altered borders as well as both the Nazi German and Soviet Russian or Polish Communist campaigns of genocide, expulsion and deportation (either from or to Poland) during and after World War II in the country, in addition to the earlier long processes of Polonization. Nevertheless, multiple ethnic minorities of various origin remain in Poland today, including some newly arrived or grown in size in recent decades.

Historical

Minorities in the Kingdom of Poland and the Polish–Lithuanian Commonwealth
Although the concept of an ethnic minority is mostly used with regard to a modern period, historically, Poland has been a very multi-ethnic country. Early on, the influx of Czech, Hungarian, Slovak, Jewish, and German settlers was particularly notable, forming significant minorities, or even majorities in urban centers. After the Polish–Lithuanian union of mid-14th century and the Union of Lublin formally establishing the Commonwealth in 1569, Lithuanians and Ruthenians constituted a major part of the Commonwealth populace.

An estimate for 1493 gives the combined population of Poland and Lithuania at 7.5 million, breaking them down by ethnicity at 
3.25 million Poles
3.75 million Ruthenians (modern day Ukrainians and Belarusians)
0.5 million Lithuanians

In 1618, after the Truce of Deulino the population of the Polish–Lithuanian Commonwealth increased together with its territory, reaching 12 million. Its inhabitants could be roughly divided into:
Poles – 4.5 million 
Ukrainians – 3.5 million 
Belarusians – 1.5 million 
Lithuanians – 0.75 million 
Prussians – 0.75 million 
Jews – 0.5 million 
Livonians – 0.5 million

At that time the szlachta, or Polish nobility, formed 10% and burghers, 15%.

With the population and territorial losses of the mid and late-17th century, in 1717 the population of the Commonwealth had declined to only 9 million, which breaks down into the following ethnic groups:
4.5 million Poles
1.5 million Ukrainians 
1.2 million Belarusians 
0.8 million Lithuanians 
0.5 million Jews 
0.5 million others

Minorities in the Second Republic

The census of 1921 allocates 30.8% of the population in the minority. This was further exacerbated with the Polish victory in the Polish-Soviet War, and the large territorial gains in the east, made by Poland as a consequence. According to the 1931 Polish Census (as cited by Norman Davies), 68.9% of the population was Polish, 13.9% were Ukrainians, around 10% Jewish, 3.1% Belarusians, 2.3% Germans and 2.8% – others, including Lithuanians, Czechs and Armenians. Also, there were smaller communities of Russians, and Romani. The situation of minorities was a complex subject and changed during the period.

Poland was also a nation of many religions. In 1921, 16,057,229 Poles (approx. 62.5%) were Roman (Latin) Catholics, 3,031,057 citizens of Poland (approx. 11.8%) were Eastern Rite Catholics (mostly Ukrainian Greek Catholics and Armenian Rite Catholics), 2,815,817 (approx. 10.95%) were Greek Orthodox, 2,771,949 (approx. 10.8%) were Jewish, and 940,232 (approx. 3.7%) were Protestants (mostly Lutheran). By 1931, Poland had the second largest Jewish population in the world, with one-fifth of all the world's Jews residing within its borders (approx. 3,136,000).

Modern

Minorities during the People's Republic
Before World War II, a third of Poland's population was composed of ethnic minorities. After the war, however, Poland's minorities were mostly gone, due to the 1945 revision of borders, and the Holocaust. Under the National Repatriation Office (Państwowy Urząd Repatriacyjny), millions of Poles were forced to leave their homes in the eastern Kresy region and settle in the western former German territories. At the same time, approximately 5 million remaining Germans (about 8 million had already fled or had been expelled and about 1 million had been killed in 1944-46) were similarly expelled from those territories into the Allied occupation zones. Ukrainian and Belarusian minorities found themselves now mostly within the borders of the Soviet Union; those who opposed this new policy (like the Ukrainian Insurgent Army in the Bieszczady Mountains region) were suppressed by the end of 1947 in the Operation Vistula.

The population of Jews in Poland, which formed the largest Jewish community in pre-war Europe at about 3.3 million people, was almost completely destroyed by 1945. Approximately 3 million Jews died of starvation in ghettos and labor camps, were slaughtered at the German Nazi extermination camps or by the Einsatzgruppen death squads. Between 40,000 and 100,000 Polish Jews survived the Holocaust in Poland, another 50,000 to 170,000 were repatriated from the Soviet Union, and 20,000 to 40,000 from Germany and other countries. At its postwar peak, there were 180,000 to 240,000 Jews in Poland, settled mostly in Warsaw, Łódź, Kraków and Wrocław.

Minority rights in the Third Republic
The rights of ethnic minorities in Poland are guaranteed in article 35 of the 1997 Constitution:
1. The Republic of Poland shall ensure Polish citizens belonging to national or ethnic minorities the freedom to maintain and develop their own language, to maintain customs and traditions, and to develop their own culture.
2. National and ethnic minorities shall have the right to establish educational and cultural institutions, institutions designed to protect religious identity, as well as to participate in the resolution of matters connected with their cultural identity.

The Act on Ethnic and National Minorities and on the Regional Language of 6 January 2005 stipulates that in order to be recognized as an ethnic or national minority a given group must reside in Poland for at least 100 years, which excludes minorities previously recognized as such under the Communist regimes, such as the Greeks. There are presently three categories of recognized minorities in Poland: 9 national minorities (Belarusians, Czechs, Lithuanians, Germans, Armenians, Russians, Slovaks, Ukrainians, Jews), four ethnic minorities (Karaites, Lemkos, Roma and Tatars), and a regional linguistic minority (Kashubians).

Poland has ratified the European Charter for Regional or Minority Languages on 12 February 2009:
Minority languages: Belarusian, Czech, Hebrew, Yiddish, Karaim, Kashub, Lithuanian, Lemko, German, Armenian, Romani, Russian, Slovak, Tatar and Ukrainian.
Regional language: Kashub
National minorities languages: Belarusian, Czech, Hebrew, Yiddish, Lithuanian, German, Armenian, Russian, Slovak and Ukrainian
Ethnic minority languages: Karaim, Lemko, Romani and Tatar
Non-territorial languages: Hebrew, Yiddish, Karaim, Armenian and Romani.

The minorities enjoy various rights, including the right for street signs and education in native language, development of the culture, non-assimilation,  etc.  In particular, in the municipalities (gminas) where they constitute more than 20% of population they have the right of official communication in the native language. Such municipalities must be included into the Official  Register  of  Municipalities where an additional, language is used. There are incentives for the officials of such municipalities to learn the regional language.

Demographics
At the Polish census of 2002, 96.7% of the people of Poland claimed Polish nationality, and 97.8% declare that they speak Polish at home. At the 2011 census, 1.44% of the 39 million inhabitants of Poland declared to be descendants of another single ancestry than Polish. That number includes 418,000 who declared to be Silesians as a national-ethnic identification (362,000 as single ethnicity and 391,000 a second ethnicity) and 17,000 Kashubians (16,000 as single ethnicity). Recognized minorities numbered 0.3% of the population: 49,000 Germans (26,000 single ethnicity), 36,000 Ukrainians (26,000 single ethnicity), 7,000 Lemkos (5,000 single ethnicity), 37,000 Belarusians (31,000 single ethnicity), 12,000 Roma people (9,000 single ethnicity), 8,000 Russians (5,000 single ethnicity). 0.2% of the population are foreign citizens.

2002 census:
38,230,080 – Total population of Poland
36,983,720 – Polish
774,885 – Nationality not specified
471,475 – Non-Polish, or multi-ethnic

Polish census of 2011:
38,512,000 – Total population of Poland
36,157,000 – Only Polish ethnicity
951,000 – Nationality not specified
1,404,000 declared non-Polish ethnicity either as a first or as a second one; 842,000 of them declared non-Polish ethnicity together with Polish one (52% of Silesians, 93% of Kashubians, 46% of Germans, 40% of Ukrainians); 640,000 declared non-Polish nationality as a first one (562,000 declared only non-Polish ethnicity); 802,000 declared non-Polish enthonationality as a second one (50% Silesian, 26% Kashubian, 8% German).

Armenians

Around 50,000 Armenians settled in Poland in the 14th century, and an Armenian colony gradually formed through successive immigrations. According to the Polish census of 2002, there are 1,082 Armenians in Poland, although Armenian-oriented sources cite estimates as high as 92,000. The Armenian Orthodox community converted to Catholicism in the 17th century.

Bangladeshis

Belarusians

In the Polish census of 2002, 48,700 people declared they belong to this group. This number fell to 46,800 in the 2011 census. They live in close concentrations on south and east area of Białystok, near and in areas adjoining the Polish-Belarusian border.

Chechens

Chechens constitute small ethnic communities within major cities such as Warsaw, Kraków, and Gdańsk.

Czechs

According to the Polish census of 2002, 386 Czechs live in Poland, many of them in Zelów or near the Czech border, such as in the Czech Corner. Arguably, the most famous Pole with Czech roots was painter Jan Matejko.

Danes
5,204 Danes live in Poland.

Frisians 
At the 2002 census, there were 109 self-declared Frisians, including 36 Polish citizens.

Germans

Germans remain in Silesia, Pomerania, Warmia-Masuria and Lubusz Land. The current estimates based on the 2002 census gives 147,094 Germans living mainly in the region of Opole, Katowice and Częstochowa (south-west part of Poland). Germans first came to Silesia during the Late Middle Ages, and were mass-expelled from regions of today's Poland which were part of the German-speaking lands for centuries.

Gorals

Polish Gorals are an ethnographic group in southern Poland that speaks a dialect of Polish that has been heavily influenced by Slovak. Some urban Poles find this very distinct dialect difficult to understand. Polish Gorals live primarily in the region of Podhale and are separated from Slovak Gorals by the High Tatra mountains, which, together with Zakopane Style architecture, form an important part of Goral identity and are part the reason why the town of Zakopane is now a popular tourist destination and winter resort town. Goralenvolk action, which was an attempt by Nazi Germany during the second world war to Germanize Polish Gorals, failed due to lack of support from the Goral population.

Greeks

Some 4,000–5,000 Greeks live in central and southeast Poland, most of whom came in 1949, after the Greek Civil War. It is estimated that after this conflict, some 14,000 Greeks came to Poland, settling mainly in the town of Zgorzelec in Lower Silesia. In the course of time, most of them returned to their homeland or moved to Germany. According to the 2011 census, there are 3,600 individuals who claim some form of Greek identity living in Poland. Among famous Poles of Greek origin are musicians Eleni Tzoka and Apostolis Anthimos.

Jews

For many centuries, Poland had the largest population of Jews worldwide, and Jews constituted Poland's first minority group. However, the community did not survive World War II. Before the war, there were 3,474,000 Jews in Poland. Those who managed to escape mostly went to live to the United States, Israel, Great Britain or Latin America. Many survivors also either willingly emigrated or were expelled by the Communists after the war. According to the Polish Ministry of the Interior and Administration, at the time of the 2002 census, there were 1,055 Jewish people in Poland. In the 2011 census, however, that had grown to 7,353. They live mainly in large cities like Warsaw, Wrocław, Kraków and Lublin.

Karaims 
At the 2002 census, there were 45 Crimean Karaims, 43 of them Polish citizens.

Kashubians

In the Polish census of 2002, only 5,100 people declared Kashubian ethnicity, although 52,665 declared Kashubian as their native language. In ten municipalities, more than 20% of the population spoke Kashubian according to the same census data: Przodkowo (49.0%), Sulęczyno (48.6%), Stężyca (43.2%), Sierakowice (39.9%), Linia (35.5%), Chmielno (34.8%), Puck (30.9%), Somonino (30.8%), Szemud (26.3%) and Parchowo (22.6%). At the 2011 census however, the number of persons declaring "Kashubian" as their first single ethnicity raised to 17,000, and 229,000 including those who declared Kashubian as first or second ethnicity. Donald Tusk, the former Polish Prime Minister, is Kashubian.

Kursenieki

While today the Kursenieki, also known as Kuronowie Pruscy and Kurończycy in Polish and Kuršininkai in Lithuanian are a nearly extinct Baltic ethnic group living along the Curonian Spit, in 1649 Kuršininkai settlement spanned from Memel (Klaipėda) to Danzig (Gdańsk). The Kuršininkai were eventually assimilated by the Germans, except along the Curonian Spit where some still live. The Kuršininkai were considered Latvians until after World War I when Latvia gained independence from the Russian Empire, a consideration based on linguistic arguments. This was the rationale for Latvian claims over the Curonian Spit, Memel, and other territories of East Prussia which would be later dropped.

Lemkos / Rusyns

At the 2002 census there were 5,863 persons (5,850 Polish citizens who declared themselves Lemkos, and 62 Rusyns), all of them Polish citizens. In the 2011 census, there were 7,000 Lemkos (first declared ethnicity) and 10,000 including those who declared Lemko as second ethnicity.

Lithuanians

There were 5,846 Lithuanians in Poland (5,639 Polish citizens), according to the 2002 census. They live in close concentrations, in Suwałki in the north-east of Poland, and in the territory of Puńsk Municipality where they constituted 74.4% of the inhabitants in 2002 (3,312 out of 4,454).

Macedonians

There were 286 Macedonians in Poland at the 2002 census, including 187 Polish citizens. There is a mention of 5,000 Macedonian speakers in 1970.

Masurians

At the 2002 census, there were 46 self-declared Masurians, all Polish citizens.

Romani

There are 12,731 Romani people in Poland, according to the 2002 census. The Polish Gypsy population has suffered heavily from their attempted extermination by Germany during World War II. They are dispersed and live across the whole country, although they are more numerous in the south of Poland.

Russians

Russians are scattered around the territory of Poland but mostly reside in eastern Poland. There are 3,244 Russians in Poland, according to the 2002 census. This society includes also Old Believers who are members of the Eastern Old Believers' Church and account for 2,000–3,000 persons living in the north-east of Poland.

Scots
Scottish people migrated to Poland in large numbers in the mid-16th century. Mostly from the Highlands of Scotland, and mainly Catholic and Episcopalian, they were fleeing from religious persecution and harsh economic conditions. There was also an extensive trade between Scotland's east coast ports such as Dundee, Leith and Aberdeen and towns such as Danzig (Gdańsk) and Königsberg (modern Kaliningrad). William Lithgow, who visited Poland in 1616, reported that there were an estimated 30,000 Scottish families living in the country, which he described as "...a mother and nurse for the youth and younglings of Scotland...in cloathing, feeding, and inrichening them". Many came from Dundee and Aberdeen and could be found in towns on the banks of the Vistula as far south as Kraków. To this day it is believed that many Poles have Scottish ancestry, albeit usually without the self-identication. At the 2011 census, there were only 26 self-declared Scots (including 13 Polish citizens).

Silesians

INTERREG estimated there are up to 2,000,000 Silesians in Poland. In the Polish census of 2002, however, 173,153 people officially declared Silesian ethnicity, although only about 60,000 declared Silesian as their native language. In the 2011 Polish census, Silesian ethnicity was declared by 809,000 responders out of 5 million in the region, including 362,000 who declared it as their only ethnicity, 418,0000 who declared it as their first ethnicity, and 415,000 who declared it jointly with a Polish ethnicity.

Slovaks
Slovaks live in some areas in southern Poland, to the number of 1,710 according to the Polish 2002 census. Polish Slovaks inhabit two small frontier regions in the Spisz and Orawa (south of Poland, near Polish-Slovak border). Larger groups of Slovaks are in Kraków and Silesia region.

Swedes
There are 1,689 Swedes living in Poland. They live in Warsaw, Szczecin, Cammin, Gdansk, and Wroclaw.

Tatars

Small populations of Polish Tatars continues to exist and still practice Islam. Some Polish towns, mainly in northeastern Poland (in Podlaskie Voivodeship) have mosques. Tatars first arrived as refugees and mercenary soldiers from Crimea beginning in the late 14th century. The Tatar population reached approximately 100,000 in 1630 but the 2002 census showed only 447 people declaring this ethnicity.

Tatars

Small populations of Polish Lipka Tatars still exist and still practice Islam. Some Polish towns, mainly in northeastern Poland (in Podlaskie Voivodeship) have mosques. Tatars arrived as mercenary soldiers beginning in the late 14th century. The Tatar population reached approximately 100,000 in 1630 but the 2002 census showed only 447 people declaring this ethnicity.

Ukrainians

Ukrainians are scattered in various eastern and northern districts. In the Polish census of 2002, 27,172 people declared they belong to this group.

Vietnamese

As of 2015, around 30,000 Vietnamese live in Poland, mostly in big cities. They publish a number of newspapers, both pro- and anti-Communist. The first immigrants were Vietnamese students at Polish universities in the post-World War II era. These numbers increased slightly during the Vietnam War, when agreements between the communist Vietnamese and Polish governments allowed Vietnamese guest workers to receive industrial training in Poland. A large number of Vietnamese immigrants also arrived after 1989.

Other
There are also nationality groups of Americans (in 2002: 1,541 of whom 992 had Polish citizenship), Britons, Turks (232, including 74 Polish citizens), Hungarians (579, including 228 Polish citizens), French (2002: 1,633 including 1,068 Polish citizens), Italians (1,367 including 835 Polish citizens), Serbs, Croats, Bulgarians (1,112, including 404 Polish citizens), Romanians, Georgians, Palestinians (229 including 146 Polish citizens) and other Arabs, Kurds, Scandinavians, Flemings (23, including 10 Polish citizens), etc.

See also
 Little Treaty of Versailles
 Refugees in Poland

References